Queen's Knickers may refer to:
The Queen's Knickers, 1993 children's book by Nicholas Allan
Queen's Knickers Award, given by the Society of Authors for an illustrated children's book